Chuckery is an unincorporated community located in far southwestern Darby Township, Union County, Ohio, United States.

History
With a history beginning in the early 19th century, it has risen and fallen in population, infrastructure, and presence. The Little Darby Creek runs directly through the town, and the original stream was dredged around 1921.  Approximately  of the Little Darby was rerouted in order to reduce the meanderings of the stream, and to assist in flood control.  The dredge route took place from Route 4 at Irwin heading east, then turned south and continued into Madison County until stopping at the intersection of Rosedale Plain City Road. The Chuckery Post office was established on April 8, 1898, but was discontinued on December 14, 1903.  The mail service is now sent through the Plain City branch.

St. Paul's Lutheran Church, which was organized in 1892 and built in 1964, is a significant part of the community.

References

External links
 Community website

Unincorporated communities in Union County, Ohio
Unincorporated communities in Ohio